Royal Mallow may refer to:
 Lavatera assurgentiflora
 Lavatera trimestris
 The Royal Mallows, a fictional regiment